The Melges 14 is an American planing sailboat that was designed by Reichel/Pugh as a one-design racer and first built in 2016.

The design was named Sailing World magazine's "Best Dinghy" of 2016.

Production
The design has been built by Melges Performance Sailboats in the United States since 2016 and remains in production.

Design
The Melges 14 is a racing sailing dinghy, built predominantly of PVC-cored fiberglass. It is raced with one sailor but can carry two adults. It has a catboat rig with a carbon fiber, two-piece mast and single-piece boom. The sail is made from Mylar. The hull has a plumb stem and a plumb, open transom, a transom-hung rudder controlled by a tiller with an extension and a retractable daggerboard. It displaces .

Removing the daggerboard allows operation in shallow water, beaching, or ground transportation on a trailer or automobile roof.

There are three different sized sails for different crew weights or wind conditions. The smaller sail sizes use shorter mast top sections.

Operational history
In a 2019 review in Sailing World Dave Reed wrote, "the Melges 14, the judges agreed, is a righteous challenger to the Laser's kingdom. It was recognized as the best dinghy in 2016, and it's a boat that will make you want to drop everything, rig up and go sailing when the breeze is on."

See also
List of sailing boat types

References

External links

Dinghies
2010s sailboat type designs
One-design sailing classes
Catboats
Sailboat type designs by Reichel/Pugh
Sailboat types built by Melges Performance Sailboats